Dighton is a populated place in Okmulgee County, Oklahoma.  It is about 7 miles east-northeast of Henryetta, Oklahoma, and is located south of US Route 266 on Bartlett Road.

Originally known as Bartlett, the town had a post office starting in 1913, but ending in 1949.  (This is not to be confused with the Bartlett neighborhood in Oklahoma City.)

References 

Unincorporated communities in Okmulgee County, Oklahoma